This is a list of electoral division results for the Australian 2001 federal election in the state of South Australia.

Overall results

Results by division

Adelaide

Barker

Bonython

Boothby

Grey

Hindmarsh

Kingston

Makin

Mayo

Port Adelaide

Sturt

Wakefield

See also 

 Members of the Australian House of Representatives, 2001–2004

References 

South Australia 2001